This article shows the rosters of all participating teams at the men's indoor volleyball tournament at the 2022 Mediterranean Games in Oran, Algeria.

Group A

The following is the Egypt's roster in the 2022 Mediterranean Games.

Head Coach:  Sayed Salem

1 Ahmed Elsayed 
6 Mohamed Hassan 
7 Seifeldin Ali 
8 Abdelrahman Eissa 
10 Mohamed Masoud 
13 Mohamed Khater 
14 Yossef Morgan 
16 Mohamed Soliman 
18 Ahmed Shfik 
19 Zyad Mohamed 
21 Youssef Awad 
23 Ahmed Omar

The following is the Italy's roster in the 2022 Mediterranean Games.

Head Coach:  Francesco Andreoni

2 Leonardo Ferrato 
3 Francesco Recine 
4 Federico Crosato  
8 Alberto Pol 
10 Marco Falaschi 
11 Davide Gardini 
14 Giulio Magalini 
15 Gabriele di Martino 
18 Fabrizio Gironi 
21 Andrea Schiro 
23 Damiano Catania 
25 Marco Vitteli

The following is the North Macedonia's roster in the 2022 Mediterranean Games.

Head Coach:  Djordje Nahod

2 Gjorg Gjorgiev 
3 Stefan Aleksov 
4 Nikola Gjorgiev 
5 Vlado Milev 
6 Kostadin Richliev 
7 Slave Nakov 
11 Filip Despotovski 
15 Filip Madjunkov 
16 Stojan Iliev 
17 Luka Kostikj 
18 Vase Mihailov 
20 Filip Savovski

Group B

The following is the Algeria's roster in the 2022 Mediterranean Games.

Head Coach:  Salim Achouri

1 Ilyas Achouri 
2 Sofiane Bouyoucef 
3 Ahmed Amir Kerboua 
6 Mohamed Amine Oumessad 
7 Ali Kerboua 
8 Boudjemaa Ikken 
9 Abderraouf Hamimes 
11 Soufiane Hosni 
16 Islem Ould Cherchali 
17 Farouk Tizit 
18 Billel Soualem 
20 Youssouf Bourouba

The following is the France's roster in the 2022 Mediterranean Games.

Head Coach:  Julien Guiborel

1 Kellian Motta Paes 
2 Luca Ramon 
3 Thomas Nevot 
6 Ibrahim Lawani 
7 Joachim Panou 
8 Francois Rebeyrol 
9 Luka Bašič 
10 Theo Faure 
11 Antoine Pathron 
12 Kevin Kaba 
13 Mousse Gueye 
15 Simon Roehrig

The following is the Greece's roster in the 2022 Mediterranean Games.

Head Coach:  Konstantinos Christofidelis

1 Aristeidis Chandrinos 
5 Spyridon Chandrinos 
6 Dimitris Komitoudis 
7 Giorgos Petreas 
8 Georgios Tzioumakas 
11 Stavros Kasampalis 
12 Theodoros Voulkidis 
13 Charalampos Andreopoulos 
15 Alexandros Raptis 
19 Dimitrios Mouchlias 
22 Dimosthenis Linardos 
23 Spyridon Chakas

The following is the Turkey's roster in the 2022 Mediterranean Games.

Head Coach:  Kerem Eryilmaz 

1 Arslan Ekşi 
3 Oğuzhan Doğruluk 
5 Oğulcan Yatgın 
8 Gökhan Gökgöz 
9 Mehmet Hacıoğlu 
10 Cansin Ogbai Enaboifo 
12 İzzet Ünver 
13 Burakhan Tosun 
15 Metin Toy 
17 Doğukan Ulu 
19 Berkay Bayraktar 
20 Mustafa Cengiz

Group C

The following is the Croatia's roster in the 2022 Mediterranean Games.

Head Coach:  Cédric Énard

1 Petar Višić  
3 Stipe Perić 
4 Kruno Nikačević 
6 Bernard Bakonji  
7 Marko Sedlaček 
9 Tino Hanžić 
10 Filip Šestan 
11 Petar Đirlić 
13 Hrvoje Pervan 
14 Tomislav Mitrašinović 
17 Ivan Mihalj 
29 Ivan Zeljković

The following is the Serbia's roster in the 2022 Mediterranean Games.

Head Coach:  Igor Žakić 

1 Uros Nikolić  
7 Andrej Polomac 
10 Dusan Nikolić 
11 Aleksa Batak 
16 Aleksandar Stefanović 
19 Stefan Negić 
23 Božidar Vučićević 
24 Stefan Skakić 
25 Luka Tadić 
28 Lazar Marinović 
34 Lazar Bajandić 
35 Andrej Rudić

The following is the Spain's roster in the 2022 Mediterranean Games.

Head Coach:  Jose Luis Molto Carbonel

1 Francisco Iribarne  
3 Víctor Rodríguez Pérez 
6 Borja Luiz Mira 
7 Jordi Ramón Ferragut  
8 Unai Larrañaga Ledo 
12 Jean Pascal Diedhiou Diatta 
15 José María Giménez Hernández  
16 Andrés Villena 
20 Alvaro Gimeno Rubio 
21 César Martín Pérez  
24 David López 
77 Miguel Ángel De Amo

The following is the Tunisia's roster in the 2022 Mediterranean Games.

Head Coach:  Khaled Ladjimi

2 Ahmed Kadhi 
3 Khaled Ben Slimene 
6 Mohamed Ali Ben Othmen Miladi 
7 Elyes Karamosli 
8 Yassine Abdelhedi 
9 Omar Agrebi 
10 Hamza Nagga 
12 Rami Bennour 
13 Selim Mbarki 
18 Ali Bongui 
19 Aymen Bouguerra 
20 Saddem Hmissi

References

External links
 Official website

2022